KaiOS is a mobile Linux distribution for keypad feature phones based on the Firefox OS open-source project. It is developed by KaiOS Technologies (Hong Kong) Limited; a company based in Hong Kong, whose largest shareholder is Chinese multinational electronics conglomerate TCL Corporation. KaiOS runs on feature phones made with low-power hardware and low power consumption (and therefore long battery life). KaiOS supports modern connectivity technologies like 4G LTE E, VoLTE, GPS, and Wi-Fi. KaiOS runs HTML5-based apps. KaiOS supports over-the-air updates and has KaiStore, a dedicated app marketplace. Some applications are preloaded, including Facebook and YouTube. , there are 500+ apps in KaiStore. The mobile operating system is comparatively lightweight on hardware resource usage, and is able to run on devices with just 256 megabytes (MB) of memory.

History 

The operating system was first released in 2017, and is developed by KaiOS Technologies Inc., a Hong Kong-based company headed by CEO Sebastien Codeville, with offices in other countries. In June 2018, Google invested US$22 million in the operating system. India-based telecom operator Reliance Jio also invested $7 million for a 16% stake in the company. In May 2019, KaiOS raised an additional US$50 million from Cathay Innovation, and previous investors Google and TCL Holdings.

In market share study results announced in May 2018, KaiOS beat Apple's iOS for second place in India, while Android dominates with 71%, albeit down by 9%. KaiOS growth is being largely attributed to the popularity of the competitively-priced JioPhone. In Q1 2018, 23 million KaiOS devices were produced.

In March 2020, Mozilla and KaiOS Technologies announced a partnership to update KaiOS with a modern version of the Gecko browser engine, and more closely aligned testing infrastructure. This change should give KaiOS four years worth of performance and security improvements and new features, including TLS 1.3, WebAssembly, WebGL 2.0, Progressive Web Apps, new video codecs like WebP, AV1, and modern JavaScript and Cascading Style Sheets (CSS) features.

Devices

Devices that are installed with KaiOS include (KaiStore may not be included, if device vendor removed it):
Alcatel Go Flip (known as Cingular Flip 2 on AT&T, Alcatel MyFlip on TracFone Wireless) and 3088X
Advan Hape Online (Indonesia) in partnership with Indosat Ooredoo.
Reliance Jio's JioPhone, F10Q, F101K, F120B, F220B, F211S, F221S, F250Y, F271I, F30C, F41T, F50Y, F61F, F81E, F90M, LF-2401, LF-2402, LF-2403, LF-2403N, all branded as LYF, JioPhone 2, F300B, F310B, JioPhone Lite, F320B
HMD Global's Nokia 8110 4G, 2720 Flip, 800 Tough, 6300 4G, 8000 4G, Nokia 2760 Flip and 2780 Flip
Energizer Energy E220, E220S, E241, E241S and Hardcase H241, H242, H280S, E282SC
Doro 7010, 7050, 7060
Cat B35
Gigaset   GL7
Maxcom MK241, MK281
WizPhone WP006, launched in Indonesia in partnership with Google and Alfamart.
MTN 3G phone (MTN Smart S 3G)
Positivo P70S (Brazil)
Multilaser ZAPP (Brazil)
Tecno T901
Jazz Digit 4G (Pakistan)
Orange Sanza 2, Sanza XL
Kitochi 4G Smart
Vodacom Smart Kitochi (Vida), Vodacom Smart Kitochi (Azumi)
QMobile 4G Plus (Pakistan)
GeoPhone T15, T19, T19i (Made in India for Bangladesh)
Sigma mobile X-Style S3500 sKai (Ukraine)
Ghia KOX1, GK3G, GQWERTY (Mexico)
myPhone Up Smart, Up Smart LTE (Poland)
Symphony PD1 4G (Bangladesh)

All KaiOS devices have ABC keypad with exceptions being Jiophone 2 and Ghia GQWERTY having a QWERTY keypad.

Partnerships
, KaiOS Technologies has partnered with Mozilla, Airfind, Avenir Telecom (Energizer), Facebook, Google, Bullitt, Doro, HMD Global, Micromax, NXP, Spreadtrum, Qualcomm, Jio, Sprint, AT&T, T-Mobile, and Orange S.A.

In March 2020, KaiOS Technologies partnered with Mozilla to bring the modern version of Gecko browser engine to future KaiOS builds.

Release history

Jailbreak 
With the release of the Nokia 8110 4G, an active community around both KaiOS and the phone arose and released the first version of a jailbreak. This gave users the ability to use apps outside KaiStore including old Firefox OS apps on KaiOS devices, as well as flashing their devices with community-created ROMs, such as GerdaOS.

References

External links
 
 An introduction to KaiOS and app development for it
 An alternative app marketplace for KaiOS

2017 software
ARM operating systems
Embedded Linux distributions
Firefox OS
Gecko-based software
Linux distributions
Mobile Linux
Open-source software converted to a proprietary license
Software that uses XUL